Fear Factor is an Australian stunt/dare reality game show. It originally aired on Nine Network in 2002, but was abruptly cancelled after only 2 episodes, and was hosted by Marc Yellin. The show pitted contestants against each other in a variety of stunts; each winner over the first six weeks received a small prize, then returned to compete against each other in a championship episode for the show's grand prize of AU $50,000.

Despite its abrupt cancellation, the entire 7-episode series was later aired in the United States on Chiller during 2011 and 2012.

References

Nine Network original programming
2002 Australian television series debuts
2002 Australian television series endings
2000s Australian game shows
2000s Australian reality television series
English-language television shows
Television series by Banijay
Television series by Endemol Australia